Gelasine is a genus of flowering plants in the family Iridaceae, first described in 1840. The entire group is endemic to South America.

The genus name is derived from the Greek word gelasinus, meaning "dimple".

 Species
 Gelasine caldensis Ravenna - Minas Gerais
 Gelasine coerulea (Vell.) Ravenna - Paraguay, southeastern Brazil, Misiones Province of Argentina
 Gelasine elongata  (Graham) Ravenna - southern Brazil, Urubual, northeastern Argentina
 Gelasine gigantea Ravenna - central Brazil
 Gelasine paranaensis Ravenna - Paraná State in southern Brazil
 Gelasine rigida Ravenna - Minas Gerais
 Gelasine uruguaiensis Ravenna - Uruguay

References

Iridaceae genera
Flora of South America
Iridaceae